Boris Petrov Sarafov (Bulgarian and ; 12 June 1872 – 28 November 1907) was a Bulgarian Army officer and  revolutionary, one of the leaders of Supreme Macedonian-Adrianople Committee (SMAC) and Internal Macedonian Revolutionary Organization (IMRO). He is considered an ethnic Macedonian in North Macedonia, having identified occasionally as a Macedonian in his life.

Biography
Boris Sarafov was born in 1872 in the village Libyahovo, Nevrokop region, in the Salonica vilayet of the Ottoman Empire (today Ilinden, Bulgaria). He grew up schooled through the Bulgarian Exarchate's school in Nevrokop and the Bulgarian Men's High School of Thessaloniki. Later Sarafov attended the Military School of His Majesty in Sofia, the capital of the recently created Principality of Bulgaria. His training in this institution ended in 1894. Afterwards he worked for a short period of time as Bulgarian Army officer. In 1895 Sarafov became a member of the Macedonian Supreme Committee and was released from the Army. He led an insurgent operation in Ottoman Macedonia and occupied Melnik for a few days. Later he worked again as an officer for a short time. Six years after the establishment of the Macedonian Supreme Committee based in Sofia, in 1899 he became its leader. As a rule, most of its leaders were with stronger connections with the governments, waging struggle for a direct unification with Bulgaria. During his time under the patronage of Prince Ferdinand, Sarafov was conjuring revolutionary ideas that later proved to be at odds with the policy of the government. Sarafov had apparently overstepped his prerogatives by plotting the assassination of a Romanian newspaper editor Ștefan Mihăileanu, who had published unflattering remarks about the Committee. The journalist's murder brought Bulgaria and Romania to the brink of war. In 1901 Sarafov was stripped of his chairmanship and jailed for a month.

Sarafov was also a man of considerable charm. He had travelled widely in Europe raising funds for a war against the Turks. This included seducing the plain daughters or bored wives of wealthy men and persuading them to make donations to the revolutionary cause. By 1904, Sarafov had a reputation of profiteering and embezzling funds from his organization. He was described by William Curtis in 1903 as "a notorious gambler and dissolute politician" and by Joseph Swire in 1939 as "violent, tiresome, unscrupulous, with a genius for publicity."

Prior to the Ilinden Uprising, Sarafov was criticized as pro-Serbian, following actions considered anti-Bulgarian. In 1902, Sarafov visited Belgrade trying to gain Serbian support for a "Macedonia for the Macedonians" to oppose the Bulgarian annexationists in Macedonia. In November 1903, Sarafov made another visit there, when he obtained an significant grant of money from the Serbian government for allowing the entry of the first Serbian bands into Macedonia, which decision was sharply criticised by other IMARO activists.

In 1902 Sarafov was elected among the leaders of the Internal Macedonian-Adrianople Revolutionary Organization (IMARO). He supported the start of the Ilinden Uprising and participated in it. After all seemed lost, he along with Dame Gruev attempted to exploit the Supremacists’ former favourable position with the Bulgarian government, by sending it a desperate letter pleading for military assistance, but failed. The failure of the Ilinden Uprising also reignited the old rivalries between the varying factions of the Macedonian revolutionary movement. Sarafov resorted back to his old ways, turning against left-wing leading figures such as Yane Sandanski and Hristo Chernopeev, earning him much suspicion. The left-wing faction opposed Bulgarian nationalism and advocated the creation of a Balkan Federation with equality for all subjects and nationalities. The Centralist's faction of the IMARO drifted increasingly towards Bulgarian nationalism since 1904. The years 1905-1907 saw the slow split between the two factions.  Finally, as a result, Sarafov was sentenced to death by the leftists. He was assassinated in 1907 in Sofia together with Ivan Garvanov by Todor Panitsa, a trusted man of Yane Sandanski.

Legacy  
A criticism of Sarafov is that he was more concerned with his own agenda than the people he claimed to represent. During his life, views of Sarafov varied by account. Edith Durham wrote in 1903 following the Ilinden Uprising that he was unpopular in the Lake Prespa region. However, in January 1904 the British consul in Monastir (Bitola) reported that he was immensely popular there. In 1903, Krste Misirkov claimed Sarafov was in opposition to the Bulgarian administration. Sarafov in 1901 stated in an interview that Macedonians had a distinct "national element"; the following year, he stated: "We the Macedonians are neither Serbs nor Bulgarians, but simply Macedonians." Yet, Sarafov maintained a balanced, pro-Bulgarian policy, which was opposed by the more radical, leftist, and pro-autonomist faction.

In SR Macedonia, Sarafov was not well received in the official historiography. The public in North Macedonia still perceives Sarafov as a controversial Supremist i.e pro-Bulgarian revolutionary. As part of the controversial Skopje 2014 project, a monument to Sarafov was erected in the center of the city in 2013. The monument was dismantled without explanation in 2016 by municipal authorities.

A street is named after Sarafov in Skopje.

In Bulgaria, streets in various towns are named after Sarafov.

Gallery

Notes

References

External links
American newspapers on Sarafov

1872 births
1907 deaths
People from Hadzhidimovo
People from Salonica vilayet
Bulgarian revolutionaries
Members of the Internal Macedonian Revolutionary Organization
Bulgarian military personnel
Bulgarian educators
Macedonian Bulgarians
Bulgarian Men's High School of Thessaloniki alumni
Assassinated Bulgarian people
People murdered in Bulgaria
Burials at Central Sofia Cemetery
Deaths by firearm in Bulgaria
Bulgarian nationalists
Macedonian educators